The 2007 DFB-Pokal Final decided the winner of the 2006–07 DFB-Pokal, the 64th running of Germany's premier football cup competition. In the final, 1. FC Nürnberg defeated VfB Stuttgart 3–2 after extra time, thereby claiming their fourth title and denying Bundesliga champions Stuttgart a double. A 109th-minute strike from Danish midfielder Jan Kristiansen won the game for Nürnberg.

Route to the final
The DFB-Pokal began with 64 teams in a single-elimination knockout cup competition. There were a total of five rounds leading up to the final. Teams were drawn against each other, and the winner after 90 minutes would advance. If still tied, 30 minutes of extra time was played. If the score was still level, a penalty shoot-out was used to determine the winner.

Note: In all results below, the score of the finalist is given first (H: home; A: away).

Match

Summary

Nürnberg started off strong in the final with a few opportunities, but a mistake by the Nürnberg defence saw Cacau open the scoring for Stuttgart 20 minutes in. Seven minutes later, Nürnberg equalised with a goal from Marek Mintál. The match went to half-time with scores level at 1–1.

Shortly after the restart, Marco Engelhardt headed the ball in to put Nürnberg ahead for the first time in the match. With 10 minutes remaining in regular time, Nürnberg goalkeeper Raphael Schäfer took down Mario Gómez, and referee Michael Weiner awarded a penalty. Pável Pardo converted the penalty to level the match at 2–2. The scores remained level, and the match went into extra time.

In the 109th minute, Jan Kristiansen shot from 28 meters out. The ball sailed over Stuttgart keeper Timo Hildebrand and hit the underside of the crossbar and going into the back of the net to give Nürnberg a 3–2 lead with 11 minutes remaining. The scores remained the same until the end of extra time, giving Nürnberg their fourth DFB-Pokal title.

Details

References

External links
 Match report at kicker.de 
 Match report at WorldFootball.net
 Match report at Fussballdaten.de 

2007
2006–07 in German football cups
VfB Stuttgart matches
1. FC Nürnberg matches
Football competitions in Berlin
2007 in Berlin
May 2007 sports events in Europe